Yoshiwara (German:Yoshiwara, die Liebesstadt der Japaner) is a 1920 German silent film directed by Arthur Bergen and starring Lya Mara and Heinrich Schroth.

Cast
 Lya Mara as Geisha Toyu  
 Heinrich Schroth as Arzt und Forscher  
 Arthur Bergen as Dr. Kitamaru  
 Reinhold Köstlin 
 Henri Peters-Arnolds 
 Joseph Römer
 Anita Berber

References

Bibliography
 Hans-Michael Bock and Tim Bergfelder. The Concise Cinegraph: An Encyclopedia of German Cinema. Berghahn Books.

External links

1920 films
Films of the Weimar Republic
Films directed by Arthur Bergen
German silent feature films
Films set in Japan
German black-and-white films
Japan in non-Japanese culture